Governor Mead may refer to:

Albert E. Mead (1861–1913), 5th Governor of Washington
John A. Mead (1841–1920), 53rd Governor of Vermont
Matt Mead (born 1962), 32nd Governor of Wyoming